Botswana was due to a delegation to compete at the 2008 Summer Paralympics in Beijing.

Tshotlego Morama, who had won gold in the women's 400m sprint in the T46 disability category at the Athens Paralympics, was due to be the country's only representative. However, she withdrew prior to the Games due to injury and, shortly before the Games began, it was announced the country's (unspecified) other athletes, who might have replaced her, had been "rejected by organisers because they do not meet the qualifying criteria", namely having participated in international events.

The official website of the International Paralympic Committee does not even list Morama as a non-starter, and considers that Botswana did not take part in the 2008 Games.

Athletics

Women

See also
2008 Summer Paralympics
Botswana at the Paralympics
Botswana at the 2008 Summer Olympics

External links
Beijing 2008 Paralympic Games Official Site
International Paralympic Committee

References

Nations at the 2008 Summer Paralympics
2008
Paralympics